The 2013–14 UMKC Kangaroos women's basketball team represented the University of Missouri–Kansas City during the 2013–14 NCAA Division I women's basketball season. The Kangaroos were led by coach Marsha Frese. They played their home games at the Swinney Recreation Center. UMKC entered the season as new members of the Western Athletic Conference and finished in sixth place in the conference.

Roster

Schedule
Source

|-
!colspan=9 style="background:#CFB53B; color:#002366;"| Exhibition

|-
!colspan=9 style="background:#002366; color:#CFB53B;"| Regular Season

|-
!colspan=9 style="background:#CFB53B; color:#002366;"| 2014 WAC women's basketball tournament

See also
2013–14 UMKC Kangaroos men's basketball team

References

Kansas City Roos women's basketball seasons
UMKC